Psilostachyins are group of chemical compounds isolated from Ambrosia psilostachya.

References

Ambrosia (plant)
Lactones